Merciless is the seventh studio album by American R&B singer Stephanie Mills. It was released in 1983 and Stephanie's second release on Casablanca Records. The album features two Billboard R&B hits in "Pilot Error", a cover version of Prince's "How Come U Don't Call Me Anymore?" as well as "My Body" written by singer Luther Vandross. Merciless received a nomination for Best R&B Vocal Performance, Female at the 26th Grammy Awards in 1984.

Track listing
 "How Come U Don't Call Me Anymore?"  (Prince) - 4:12
 "Never Get Enough of You"  (David Wolfert, Henry Gaffney) - 4:31
 "Eternal Love"  (Jay Asher, Paul Jabara) - 4:41
 "His Name is Michael" (featuring Peggi Blu)  (Cassandra Mills, Michael Sembello, Stephanie Mills) - 3:18
 "Here I Am"  (David Wolfert, Henry Gaffney) - 4:13
 "My Body"  (Luther Vandross) - 4:06
 "Do You Love Him?"  (Barbara Morr, Betsy Durkin Matthes) - 3:47
 "Pilot Error"  (Peter Kingsbery) - 5:07
 "Since We've Been Together"  (Ralph Schuckett, Richard Kleinberg) - 3:13

 track source

Personnel 
 Stephanie Mills – lead and backing vocals
 Greg Phillinganes – keyboards, acoustic piano
 Richard Tee – keyboards, acoustic piano
 Johnny Mandel – synthesizers, arrangements (7)
 Danny Sembello – synthesizers 
 Nyle Steiner – synthesizers
 Ian Underwood – synthesizers 
 Ed Walsh – synthesizers 
 Buzz Feiten – guitars 
 Carlos Rios – guitars 
 Thom Rotella - guitars
 Michael Sembello – guitars, backing vocals 
 David Wolfert – guitars, arrangements (1, 2, 3, 5, 6, 8, 9), BGV arrangements
 Nathan East – bass 
 Neil Stubenhaus – bass
  Ed Greene – drums 
 John Robinson - drums
 Carlos Vega – drums 
 Lenny Castro – percussion 
 Victor Feldman – percussion
 Eddie Karam – arrangements (7)
 Ralph Schuckett – rhythm arrangements (9)
 Frank Floyd – BGV arrangements 
 Peggi Blu – backing vocals
 Lani Groves – backing vocals 
 Yvonne Lewis – backing vocals
 Cruz Sembello – backing vocals 
 Myrna Smith – backing vocals

Technical
 John Arrais – engineer, mixing (1, 2, 3, 5-9), remixing (1, 2, 3, 5-9)
 Phil Ramone – mixing (4)
 Peter Chaiken – engineer
 Lee DeCarlo – engineer 
 Bradshaw Leigh – engineer 
 Brian McGee – engineer 
 Marie Ostrosky – engineer 
 Jay Rifkin – engineer
 Ted Jensen – mastering at Sterling Sound (New York, NY)

Production
 Charles Koppleman – executive producer 
 Gary Klein – producer (1, 2, 3, 5-9)
 David Wolfert – producer (1, 2, 3, 5-9)
 Phil Ramone – producer (4)
 Linda Gerrity – production coordinator 
 Glen Christensen – art direction, photography 
 Mac James – artwork, design 
 Bill King – inner sleeve photography 
 Cassandra Mills – cover concept 
 Stephanie Mills – cover concept
 Frank DeCaro – LA contractor 
 Phil Medley – NY contractor

Charts

References

1983 albums
Stephanie Mills albums
Albums arranged by Johnny Mandel
Albums produced by Phil Ramone
Albums produced by Gary Klein (producer)
Casablanca Records albums